Rupayi Raja also spelled as Roopayi Raja is a 1993 Indian Kannada drama film written and directed by B. Mallesh starring Jaggesh, Abhijith and Shruti in the lead roles.

The film produced by S. A. Chinne Gowda and S. A. Srinivas in the banner of Sri Chowdeshwari Art Combines has musical score by Hamsalekha.

Cast 
 Jaggesh 
 Abhijith 
 Shruti 
 Umashree 
 Aravind 
 Girija Lokesh 
 Lakshmi Bhat
 Venkatesh 
 K. S. Ashwath 
 Dheerendra Gopal
 Bank Janardhan 
 Honnavalli Krishna

Music 

The film had its soundtrack scored and composed by Hamsalekha.
 Onda Erada Odida — S. P. B.
 Oh Bangarapurada — K. S. Chitra, S. P. B.
 Hendthige — S. P. B.
 Seere Ogedare — S. P. B.
 Idyaking Aaduthiyappo — K. S. Chitra, S. P. B.

References 

Indian comedy films
Films scored by Hamsalekha
Films with screenplays by Chi. Udayashankar
1990s Kannada-language films
Films directed by B. Mallesh